Branko Nadoveza (11 September 1950 – 12 October 1970) was a Serbian footballer who played for FK Partizan.

Death and legacy
He died on 12 October 1970 after succumbing to injuries he received in a car accident in the Dušanovac neighbourhood of Belgrade two days prior.

The FK Partizan Academy is named in his honour.

References

1950 births
1970 deaths
People from Zemun
Footballers from Belgrade
Serbian footballers
Yugoslav footballers
Association football defenders
Yugoslav First League players
FK Partizan players
Road incident deaths in Yugoslavia
Road incident deaths in Serbia